Odenville is a city in St. Clair County, Alabama, United States. It incorporated in 1914. At the 2010 census the population was 3,585, up from 1,131 in 2000. It annexed the former town of Branchville in 2007. Odenville annexed a portion of Springville in 2015 due to Springville not running water to some of its residences.

Geography
Odenville is located at  (33.681762, -86.399295).

Odenville is located in St. Clair County and is minutes away from the cities of Birmingham and Trussville. Highway 411 transverses the town.

Demographics

2000 census
At the 2000 census there were 1,131 people, 421 households, and 333 families in the town. This figure is now much higher, but not yet recorded, due to a continued influx of population due to desirable location, affordable real-estate and good schools. The racial makeup of the town was 95.93% White, 1.95% Black or African American, 0.35% Native American, 0.35% from other races, and 1.41% from two or more races. 1.33% of the population were Hispanic or Latino of any race.
Of the 421 households 39.4% had children under the age of 18 living with them, 61.5% were married couples living together, 12.1% had a female householder with no husband present, and 20.9% were non-families. 19.5% of households were one person and 9.5% were one person aged 65 or older. The average household size was 2.69 and the average family size was 3.07.

The age distribution was 26.5% under the age of 18, 9.2% from 18 to 24, 30.7% from 25 to 44, 21.9% from 45 to 64, and 11.7% 65 or older. The median age was 35 years. For every 100 females, there were 92.5 males. For every 100 females age 18 and over, there were 92.8 males.

The median household income was $36,473 and the median family income  was $40,694. Males had a median income of $31,429 versus $21,736 for females. The per capita income for the town was $17,330. About 5.0% of families and 5.9% of the population were below the poverty line, including 7.0% of those under age 18 and 10.5% of those age 65 or over.

70% were high school graduates or higher, and 7.2% had a bachelor's degree or higher.

2010 census
At the 2010 census there were 3,585 people, 1,341 households, and 1,033 families in the town. The racial makeup of the town was 94.2% White, 2.3% Black or African American, 0.3% Native American, 1.1% from other races, and 1.5% from two or more races. 2.1% of the population were Hispanic or Latino of any race.
Of the 1,341 households 31.6% had children under the age of 18 living with them, 61.1% were married couples living together, 10.6% had a female householder with no husband present, and 23.0% were non-families. 20.2% of households were one person and 7.2% were one person aged 65 or older. The average household size was 2.67 and the average family size was 3.06.

The age distribution was 24.7% under the age of 18, 8.8% from 18 to 24, 28.0% from 25 to 44, 26.3% from 45 to 64, and 12.1% 65 or older. The median age was 37.2 years. For every 100 females, there were 95.5 males. For every 100 females age 18 and over, there were 94.2 males.

The median household income was $53,936 and the median family income  was $61,646. Males had a median income of $45,652 versus $31,875 for females. The per capita income for the town was $22,464. About 5.5% of families and 7.6% of the population were below the poverty line, including 5.4% of those under age 18 and 3.3% of those age 65 or over.

2020 census

As of the 2020 United States census, there were 4,969 people, 1,381 households, and 1,124 families residing in the city.

Education

The first school in Odenville  was a log, one-room school building built in 1864. Odenville has had other community schools in the area since the middle of the 19th century, including the Friendship School, Low Gap School and Branchville School. The first Odenville School, a wooden structure established by Mr. Jim Hardin and Thay Bayer, burned in 1907. Students had to meet in churches during construction of a new school. On July 18, 1908 the original St. Clair County High School building was constructed. A historic monument engraved with the names of the original county leaders responsible for the construction of this first high school stands in front of what is now Odenville Middle School.

Notable people
 Dee Ford, professional football linebacker
 James Shaw, professional football wide receiver.
Ralph Compton, author, Western-style writer.

References

Heritage of St. Clair County, Page 38, Heritage Publishing Consultants Inc., P.O. Box 67,    Clanton, Alabama, 35046.

Towns in St. Clair County, Alabama
Towns in Alabama
Birmingham metropolitan area, Alabama